Nootdorp Panthers are a rugby league team from the town of Nootdorp in South Holland, Netherlands. They were founded in 2007 and are the first domestic rugby league club in the Netherlands. They play in the Dutch Grand Prix Competition which was formed in 2008.

See also

Rugby league in the Netherlands
Netherlands national rugby league team

References

Rugby league in the Netherlands
Dutch rugby league teams
Rugby clubs established in 2007
Sports clubs in South Holland
Sport in Pijnacker-Nootdorp